İmamlı is a village in Silifke district of Mersin Province, Turkey. At  it is a situated in the southern slopes of  Toros Mountains. Main economic activities are agriculture and animal breeding. The village people were also allowed by the forestry authorities in Mersin to pick bay laurel in the forests

See also
Meydankale
Gökkale

References

Villages in Silifke District